Bidein a' Chabair (867 m) is a mountain in the Knoydart peninsula, Lochaber, on the west coast of Scotland. It is part of the Northwest Highlands.

A conical peak, it lies in one of the most remote and rugged corners of Scotland. The nearest town is Fort William.

References

Mountains and hills of the Northwest Highlands
Marilyns of Scotland
Corbetts